Eugenie Forde (June 22, 1879 – September 5, 1940) was an American silent film actress. 
 
She starred in 73 films between 1912 and 1927 in films such as The Diamond from the Sky (1915) and Wives and Other Wives with actors such as Charlotte Burton and William Garwood.

Forde retired from acting in 1924, but a trip to Europe spurred her to return to the profession. She found that her films were still being shown in Europe, and fans there encouraged her to resume her career. She returned to the screen in That's My Baby (1926).

She was the mother of actress Victoria Forde.

Selected filmography

 The Power of Melody (1912, short)
 The Diamond from the Sky (1915) - Hagar Harding
 The Great Question (1915, short) - Lois Valerie - an Adventuress
 The Smugglers of Santa Cruz (1916, short) - Jean
 The White Rosette (1916) - Lady Elfrieda / Frieda Carewe
 True Nobility (1916) - Countess Nicasio
 Lying Lips (1916) - Wanda Howard
 The Courtesan (1916) - Mayda St. Maurice
 Purity (1916) - Judith Lure
 The Light (1916) -Zonia
 The Undertow (1916) - Mrs. King
 Lonesome Town (1916) - Mrs. Wonder
 The Innocence of Lizette (1916) - Granny Page
 The Gentle Intruder (1917) - Mrs. Baxter
 Annie-for-Spite (1917) - Mrs. Emily Nottingham
 The Upper Crust (1917) - Mrs. Todd
 Charity Castle (1917) - Zelma Verona
 Conscience (1917) - Madge's Mother
 Cupid's Round Up (1918) - Red Bird
 Wives and Other Wives (1918) - Mrs. Doubleday
 Fair Enough (1918) - Mrs. Ellen Dickson
 The Girl o' Dreams (1918) - Mrs. Hansen
 Sis Hopkins (1919) - Miss Peckover
 The Man Who Turned White (1919) - Minor Role (uncredited)
 Strictly Confidential (1919) - Jane
 Bonnie Bonnie Lassie (1919)
 The Virgin of Stamboul (1920) - Agia - Sari's Mother
 The Road to Divorce (1920) - Aunt Mehitable
 A Tokyo Siren (1920) - Minor role
 Sic-Em (1920) - Mrs. Chatfield Curtis
 See My Lawyer (1921) - Aunt Kate
A Ridin' Romeo (1921) - Queenie Farrell
 Fortune's Mask (1922) - Madame Ortiz
 Cameo Kirby (1923) - Madame Davezac
 Blow Your Own Horn (1923) - Mrs. Jolyon
 Memory Lane (1926) - Mary's Mother
 That's My Baby (1926) - Mrs. John Raynor
 Captain Salvation (1927) - Mrs. Bellows
 Wilful Youth (1927) - Mrs. Claudia Tavernay (final film role)

References

External links

 

Actresses from New York City
American film actresses
American silent film actresses
1879 births
1940 deaths
20th-century American actresses